Chlorofluoromethane or Freon 31 is the hydrochlorofluorocarbon (HCFC) with the formula CH2ClF. It is a colorless, odorless, flammable gas.

Uses
Pyrolysis of a mixture of dichlorofluoromethane and chlorofluoromethane gives hexafluorobenzene:
3 CHCl2F  +  3 CH2ClF →   C6F6  +  9 HCl
It was used as a refrigerant and has an ozone depletion potential of 0.02.

Additional data
Its crystal structure is monoclinic with space group P21 and lattice constants a = 6.7676, b = 4.1477, c = 5.0206 (0.10−1 nm), β = 108.205°.

At an altitude of 22 km, traces of chlorofluoromethane occur (148 ppt).

References

External links 
 Thermochemical table at chemnet.ru
 Infrared Spectrum of Chlorofluoromethane
 IARC Summaries & Evaluations: Vol. 41 (1986), Vol. 71 (1999)

Hydrochlorofluorocarbons
Halomethanes
Refrigerants
IARC Group 3 carcinogens